Perth (also known as Perth—Wilmot) was a federal electoral district in Ontario, Canada, that was represented in the House of Commons of Canada from 1935 to 1988. This riding was created in 1933 from Perth North and parts of Perth South ridings.

It initially consisted of the county of Perth, excluding the townships of Fullarton and Hibbert, but including the city of Stratford, the town of Mitchell, and the part of the village of Tavistock that lies in the county of Perth.

In 1947, Perth riding was redefined to consist of the county of Perth, excluding the townships of Fullarton, Logan, and Hibbert but including the city of Stratford and that part of the village of Tavistock contained in the township of Easthope South.

In 1952, it was redefined to consist of the county of Perth, excluding the township of Hibbert but including the city of Stratford and that part of the village of Tavistock contained in the township of Easthope South.

In 1966, it was redefined to consist of the County of Perth (excluding the Town of Palmerston and the Village of Tavistock), and that part of the County of Waterloo contained in the Township of Wilmot.

The name of electoral district was changed in 1970 to Perth—Wilmot.

Perth—Wilmot was abolished in 1976 when it was redistributed between Oxford, Perth and Waterloo ridings.

The new riding of Perth consisted of County of Perth. Perth electoral district was abolished in 1987 when it was incorporated into Perth—Wellington—Waterloo riding.

Members of Parliament

Electoral history

Perth, 1933 - 1970

Perth—Wilmot, 1970 - 1976

Perth, 1976 - 1987

See also 

 List of Canadian federal electoral districts
 Past Canadian electoral districts

External links 
Election results (1976 - 1987) from the Library of Parliament
Election results (1933 - 1970) from the Library of Parliament

Former federal electoral districts of Ontario